Holzen Abbey (Kloster Holzen) was a convent of Benedictine nuns at the village of Holzen (west of the B2 at Nordendorf above the Schmutter) in Allmannshofen in Bavaria, Germany.

History
Legend recounts that it was founded in 1150 by Marquard von Donnersberg as a double monastery of Benedictine monks and nuns below the present site. After the women's convent was enlarged in the 15th century the abbey of monks was dissolved in 1470 as part of the Melker reform. The monastery sustained severe damage during the Peasants' War in 1525. It was made an abbey in 1617. The abbey was abandoned in 1632 due to Swedish invasion; the nuns returned in 1647. In 1696 the foundation stone was laid for the current monastery on the Karlsberg mountain.

During secularization the monastery was dissolved and handed over to the princes of Hohenzollern-Sigmaringen, although the nuns were allowed to stay in the monastery. The whole complex passed by marriage to the counts of Fischler-Treuberg in 1813.

Between July and October 1877 the painter Wilhelm Leibl lived on the monastic lands in Holzen and his home became a meeting place for the painters from Munich who gathered around him, as well as where he painted his portrait of Rosine Edle von Poschinger, sister of Bismarck's biographer Heinrich von Poschinger. He also painted Count Treuberg, whose son Ernst Ludwig Count Fischler von Treuberg in 1904 married Hetta Countess Treuberg, later known as a pacifist, who stayed on at Holzen until their divorce in 1914. Ferdinand Fischler von Treuberg's relative Pedro II of Brazil often visited Holzen, as did Carlo Caputo, apostolic nuncio to the king of Bavaria.

Abbey Church
The Church of St. John the Baptist was consecrated in 1710. The new building contains a Baroque interior with rich stucco work by Benedikt Vogel and sculptures by Ehrgott Bernhard Bendl. It held a pilgrimage to the Christ Child from 1740 onwards.

Present Day
The Congregation of St. Joseph of Ursberg was founded by Dominikus Ringeisen in 1897 with the apostolate of caring for people with disabilities. The Treuberg family sold the monastery buildings to the St. Josef Congregation of Ursberg via a middleman in 1927. They turned it into a facility for people with disabilities, offering living and working opportunities. 

As of 2022 there are seventy-two sisters working at four sites. In 1996 the congregation established the "Dominikus-Ringeisen-Werk" as an independent church foundation under public law and transferred ownership of the abbey to DRW. In 2008 Kloster Holzen GmbH was founded. The convent has been redeveloped as a hotel and conference center. 
It also hosts a pilgrim building, providing accommodations at reduced price. One of the routes for the Way of St. James runs directly past the Hotel Kloster Holzen; the Romantic Road is not far.

There is also a daycare centre for the elderly on site. The results of their creativity and skill can be seen at the Hotel Kloster Holzen and be purchased at the Kloster Holzen shop.

See also
 Ursberg Abbey

References

External links

Benedictine nunneries in Germany
Former Christian monasteries in Germany
1150 establishments
Buildings and structures in Bavaria